Sirkka-Liisa Anttila (born 20 December 1943, Marttila) is a Finnish politician and was the Minister of Agriculture and Forestry in Matti Vanhanen's second cabinet and Mari Kiviniemi's cabinet. She represents the Centre Party.

Political career
 Forssa town council member 1977–
 Member of the Finnish parliament 1983–1996
 Member of the European Parliament 1996–1999
 Member of the Finnish parliament 1999–
 Minister of Agriculture and Forestry, 2007–2011

In addition to her role in parliament, Anttila has been serving as member of the Finnish delegation to the Parliamentary Assembly of the Council of Europe since 2003; she had previously been a member of between 1989 and 1996. As member of the Centre Party, she is part of the Alliance of Liberals and Democrats for Europe group. She is a member of the Committee on Legal Affairs and Human Rights, the Committee on the Honouring of Obligations and Commitments by Member States of the Council of Europe (Monitoring Committee) and the Sub-Committee on the implementation of judgments of the European Court of Human Rights.

Other activities
 Finnish Institute of International Affairs (FIIA), Member of the Board

References

External links
 Personal website

1943 births
Living people
People from Marttila
Finnish Lutherans
Centre Party (Finland) politicians
Ministers of Agriculture of Finland
Members of the Parliament of Finland (1983–87)
Members of the Parliament of Finland (1987–91)
Members of the Parliament of Finland (1991–95)
Members of the Parliament of Finland (1995–99)
Members of the Parliament of Finland (1999–2003)
Members of the Parliament of Finland (2003–07)
Members of the Parliament of Finland (2007–11)
Members of the Parliament of Finland (2011–15)
Members of the Parliament of Finland (2015–19)
MEPs for Finland 1996–1999
20th-century women MEPs for Finland
Centre Party (Finland) MEPs
Women government ministers of Finland
21st-century Finnish women politicians
Women members of the Parliament of Finland